The 1983 Montana Grizzlies football team represented the University of Montana in the 1983 NCAA Division I-AA football season as a member of the Big Sky Conference (Big Sky). The Grizzlies were led by fourth-year head coach Larry Donovan, played their home games at Dornblaser Field and finished the season with a record of four wins and six losses (4–6, 3–4 Big Sky).

Prior to the season, quarterback Marty Mornhinweg and fullback Joe Klucewich were suspended for academic infractions.

Schedule

References

External links
Montana Grizzlies football – 1983 media guide

Montana
Montana Grizzlies football seasons
Montana Grizzlies football